Waseda University R.F.C. was founded in 1918. It is one of the top rugby union clubs for students in Japan, together with Kanto Gakuin University RFC, Keio University RFC and Doshisha University RFC.

It is the representative club of Waseda University and has produced many players for the Japan national rugby union team.

Notable victories

 1966 - Waseda win their first All-Japan Rugby Football Championship and the University championship rugby title.
 1971 - Waseda win their second All-Japan Rugby Football Championship, beating Shinnitetsu Kamaishi 30–16.
 1972 - Waseda win their third All-Japan Rugby Football Championship, beating Mitsubishi Jikou 14–11.
 1988 - Waseda win their fourth All-Japan Rugby Football Championship, beating Toshiba Fuchuu 22–16.
 Waseda, coached by Katsuyuki Kiyomiya, beat Toyota Verblitz 28–24 in the All-Japan Rugby Football Championship at Chichibunomiya on February 12, 2006. It was thus the first Japanese university to beat a Top League team. (In the semi-final Waseda lost to Toshiba Brave Lupus 0-43.)

Players

Past

Katsuyuki Kiyomiya
Hiroaki Shukuzawa - Japan national rugby union team coach 
Katsuhiko Oku - diplomat
Yoshiro Mori - former Prime Minister

Coaches

Onishi Tetsunosuke
Katsuyuki Kiyomiya (2001-2006). He was formerly a player for Waseda and Suntory. In February 2006 a book was published by him in Japanese entitled Kyukyoku no Shori:Ultimate Crush  He has been hugely successful with Waseda. The book has been translated into English. See here.
 Ryuji Nakatake (2006-

See also
Katsuhiko Oku

References
 ULTIMATE CRUSH: Waseda University Rugby, Leadership and Building the Strongest Winning Team in Japan by Katsuyuki Kiyomiya, translated into English by Ian Ruxton (September 2006)

External links
Katsuyuki Kiyomiya
Waseda University R.F.C. - official website

Waseda
Rugby in Kantō
University and college rugby union clubs
Waseda University